Leporinus altipinnis is a species of ray-finned fish in the family Anostomidae. It lives in the Iténez-Guaporé river basin of South America.

References

Taxa named by Nikolai Andreyevich Borodin
Taxa described in 1929
Fish described in 1929
Anostomidae